Brent Lee Honeywell Jr. (born March 31, 1995) is an American professional baseball pitcher for the San Diego Padres of Major League Baseball (MLB). He was drafted by the Tampa Bay Rays in the second round of the 2014 MLB draft. After 1,298 days and four arm surgeries between professional appearances, Honeywell made his MLB debut on April 11, 2021.

Career

Early life and amateur career
Honeywell was born in Carnesville, Georgia, to Brent Honeywell, Sr and Sabrina Cantera White. The elder Brent Honeywell was a high school teacher and former Minor League Baseball player from Michigan who settled in Georgia after playing for the Augusta Pirates.

Honeywell attended Franklin County High School in Carnesville, where he played baseball for his father, the school's coach. He went undrafted out of high school and attended Walters State Community College for one year, where he went 10–3 with a 2.81 earned run average (ERA), 102 strikeouts and only 15 walks. During that season, his velocity increased from the mid-80 miles per hour range into the 90s. Honeywell was drafted by the Tampa Bay Rays in the second round of the 2014 Major League Baseball draft.

Professional career

Tampa Bay Rays
He signed with the Rays and made his professional debut with the Princeton Rays. He finished his first year with a 1.07 ERA with 40 strikeouts in  innings over nine games (eight starts). Honeywell started 2015 with the Bowling Green Hot Rods of the Class A Midwest League and was later promoted to the Charlotte Stone Crabs of the Class A-Advanced Carolina League. He posted a combined 9–6 record with a 3.18 ERA in 24 total starts between both clubs.

Prior to the 2016 season, Honeywell appeared in preseason prospect rankings for the first time, reaching as high as 43rd in MLB.com's rankings. He began 2016 back with Charlotte, and later received a promotion to the Montgomery Biscuits of the Class AA Southern League. He finished the season with a combined 7–3 record and a 2.34 ERA  in 20 starts between both teams.

Honeywell started the 2017 season with Montgomery and was quickly promoted to the Durham Bulls of the Class AAA International League. He started for the United States in the 2017 All-Star Futures Game. Honeywell earned MVP honors at the Futures Game after striking out four batters over two scoreless innings, becoming the first pitcher in Futures Game history to win the award. On August 28, 2017, Honeywell was suspended for four games by the organization due to undisclosed disciplinary reasons. In 26 total starts between Montgomery and Durham, Honeywell posted a 13–9 record with a 3.49 ERA along with 172 strikeouts in a career high 136.2 innings pitched. The Rays added him to their 40-man roster after the 2017 season.

Heading into the 2018 season, Honeywell peaked on preseason prospect lists, ranking as high as the 11th-best prospect according to Baseball America. However, on February 22, 2018, Honeywell left a spring training workout with an arm injury. The following day, he was diagnosed with a torn ulnar collateral ligament in his elbow. He underwent Tommy John surgery and was ousted for the entire 2018 season. He was optioned to Triple-A Durham on March 9, 2018, but could not participate anyway in the aftermath of Tommy John. On June 8, 2019, while throwing a bullpen session, he fractured a bone in his right elbow and was ruled out for the 2019 season. In May 2020, he underwent a compression procedure on his right ulnar nerve, removing scar tissue from around the nerve. This surgery caused him to be out for the 2020 season. Following the 2020 season, Honeywell dropped out of the preseason prospect rankings for Baseball Prospectus, MLB.com and Baseball America for the first time since the offseason after he was drafted.

On April 10, 2021, Honeywell was promoted to the major leagues for the first time and announced as the opener for the Rays’ game the next day.  Honeywell made his MLB debut on April 11, 2021 as the starting pitcher against the New York Yankees, his first professional game since September 19, 2017. In the game, he recorded two perfect innings and his first two MLB strikeouts, punching out Giancarlo Stanton and Gleyber Torres.

Oakland Athletics
On November 19, 2021, Honeywell was traded to the Oakland Athletics for cash considerations. On April 7, 2022, Honeywell was placed on the 60-day injured list after suffering a stress reaction in his right elbow. Honeywell split his season between the Single-A Stockton Ports and the Triple-A Las Vegas Aviators, accumulating an 0-3 record and 7.08 ERA with 24 strikeouts in 20.1 innings pitched across 13 total games. He elected free agency on November 10, 2022.

San Diego Padres
On January 6, 2023, Honeywell signed a major league deal with the San Diego Padres. The split deal pays $725,000 in the major leagues and $200,000` in the minor leagues.

Personal life
His father, Brent Honeywell, played Minor League Baseball from 1988 to 1990. His father is a cousin of two-time All-Star and 1974 NL Cy Young Award winner Mike Marshall.

References

External links

1995 births
Baseball players from Georgia (U.S. state)
Bowling Green Hot Rods players
Charlotte Stone Crabs players
Durham Bulls players
Living people
Major League Baseball pitchers
Montgomery Biscuits players
People from Carnesville, Georgia
Peoria Javelinas players
Princeton Rays players
Tampa Bay Rays players
Walters State Senators baseball players